This Is Not a Ball is a feature documentary film premiered in June 2014 produced by Emilio Azcarraga Jean and Bernardo Gomez and El Mall and Videocine as producing companies. The documentary is directed by Brazilian artist Vik Muniz and Juan Rendón. The documentary narrates the story of how a small round object such as a soccer ball can transform the lives of individuals and communities around the world. It explores the passion for soccer in countries such as Brazil, Mexico, Germany, Sierra Leone, China and Pakistan. Throughout the documentary, there are interviews with children from the favelas of Rio de Janeiro, with American astrophysicist Neil deGrasse Tyson and other personalities.

Synopsis
Brazilian artist Vik Muniz traveled the world and witnessed how can a small round object transform the lives of individuals and communities. This is not a Ball explores the passion for football and tries to replicate the impact of the ball on a larger scale trying to connect individuals with their society or even greater purposes.
These endeavors range from Pakistan, Mexico, Brazil, China and all the way to Sierra Leone searching for the meaning and importance of a soccer ball in different societies. The film includes interviews with personalities like Neil De Grasse Tyson.

Impact
With the support of the globally recognized social organization Fundación Televisa, and global development experts: , #Passtheball undertakes the launch of a global initiative for social good. Twelve organizations that focus on football as a tool of change will benefit from the collective work. Vik Muniz makes the viewer an active participant in the film by presenting opportunities to collaborate both during and after the movie plays. Over 20,000 soccer balls were used to construct two art installation pieces in Brazil and Mexico. Those soccer balls will be repurposed and sold as part of This is not a Ball's fundraising effort, #Passtheball—a social movement that enables the documentary to transcend the two-dimensional cinematic experience by impacting the world around us.

References

External links
 
 Fundación Televisa
 Hubs of the World Economic Forum's Global Shapers community of São Paulo and Rio
 Street Football World

2014 films
2014 documentary films
Documentary films about association football